Khadija Sultana (1600 - died after 1665) was the regent of the Bijapur Sultanate between 1656 and 1661. 

She was the daughter of Sultan Muhammad Qutb Shah, married to Mohammed Adil Shah, Sultan of Bijapur and possible mother of Ali Adil Shah II, and acted as the regent for him during his minority.

Biography
Khadija Sultana was the daughter of Muhammad Qutb Shah of Golkonda (1593-1626) and an unknown mother. In 1633 she married Sultan Muhammad Adil Shah of Bijapur (1613-1656) who ruled as the Sultan of Bijapur from 1626 to 1656. She was of the highest rank among his wives holding the title Bari Sahiba. In late 1635 or early 1636, she played a key role in a palace coup in which a minister, Khawas Khan, was deposed.

Following her husband's death in 1656, she became regent of the Bajipur Sultanate for his son and heir Ali Adil Shah II who was still a minor. It is unknown whether he was Khadija's biological son or not. According to a contemporary English source, Ali was the son of Muhammad and one of his concubines. Rumors began circulating that he was illegitimate, which was taken as an excuse by the Mughal emperor to invade the Bijapur Sultanate.  Khadija was allied with the Dutch company, and in 1659 sent troops to the company's attack on Goa. Her regency ended in 1661. During a pilgrimage to Mecca in 1661, she was transported on one of the Dutch company's ships. It was exceptional, not only because members of Indian dynasties often only used their own ships on their way to Mecca, but also because she, as a Muslim woman, traveled with non-Muslims. She and her female staff were taken on board the boat between a corridor of screens, to a boat that was also equipped with a tent. It is unknown how much contact Khadija had with the Dutch staff on board, but a Dutch helmsman and an English sailor during the voyage converted to Islam and stopped when the ship docked in Mecca. This resulted in an international scandal, as this would have been due to Khadija. Even years later, Khadija denied any involvement.

Khadija returned in 1662 on an Indian ship back to Bijapur. She traveled in 1663 to Persia and the holy Shiite sites of Iraq. The traces of her cease in 1665.

References

17th-century women rulers
Adil Shahi dynasty
Qutb Shahi dynasty
17th-century Indian politicians